Fragile site, folic acid type, rare, fra(2)(q13) is a protein that in humans is encoded by the FRA2B gene.

References